Uksunny (Uqśınnı) is a rural locality (a village) in Ismagilovsky Selsoviet, Aurgazinsky District, Bashkortostan, Russia. The population was 73 as of 2010. There is 1 street.

Geography 
Uksunny is located 15 km north of Tolbazy (the district's administrative centre) by road. Mars is the nearest rural locality.

References 

Rural localities in Aurgazinsky District